The 2019–20 season was Manchester United Women's second season since they were founded and their first in the FA Women's Super League, the professional top-flight women's league in England. The club also competed in the FA Cup and League Cup.

Following the departure of Alex Greenwood in August 2019, Katie Zelem was named as her successor as club captain.

On 13 March 2020, in line with the FA's response to the coronavirus pandemic, it was announced the season was temporarily suspended until at least 3 April 2020. After later extending the postponement until 30 April, on 3 April, the FA announced that the WSL and Women's Championship would be suspended indefinitely. The season was ultimately ended prematurely on 25 May 2020 with immediate effect.

Pre-season 
United prepared for their debut season as a top-flight team with their first ever game against foreign opposition, traveling to Norway to play Toppserien side Vålerenga on 31 July, in conjunction with the men's team who played in the same city the day before. United also faced Norwegian third division side Sandefjord on 3 August and preceded their trip abroad with a closed-doors friendly at home to Blackburn Rovers.

FA Women's Super League 

Following a successful debut season in the FA Women's Championship, Manchester United earned promotion to the FA Women's Super League. On 10 May 2019, the FA confirmed Manchester United had been granted a license to compete in the WSL for the 2019–20 season.

Matches
The opening weekend WSL fixtures were announced on 1 July 2019 and included the first Manchester derby between the two women's teams with the fixture being played at the City of Manchester Stadium. The remaining league fixtures were announced on 10 July 2019. Manchester United played 14 of the intended 22 league fixtures prior to the season being cut short and were awarded fourth place on a points-per-game basis, the same place they were when the season ended.

League table

Women's FA Cup 

Manchester United entered the Women's FA Cup in the fourth round with the rest of the top two tiers and were drawn against Manchester City, one of only two all-WSL ties of the round. It was the third time the derby rivals had met in the 2019–20 season having already faced off in the league and League Cup. The match was selected as the televised game of the round live on the BBC Red Button and subsequently rescheduled from the typical Sunday when the rest of the round's fixtures were played, to the preceding Saturday. City won 3–2 with goals from England internationals Ellen White and Jill Scott proving the difference while a controversial no-goal decision put the lack of goal-line technology in women's football under scrutiny. It marked the first time Manchester United had lost the first knockout game of either domestic cup competition at the fourth attempt.

FA Women's League Cup

Group stage 
Manchester United were entered into Group C for the 2019–20 League Cup alongside fellow WSL teams Birmingham City, Everton and Manchester City, and Championship side Leicester City. On 21 November 2019, United defeated Leicester City 11–1 to set a new club record home win and the second largest margin of victory in the competition's history, bettered only by Chelsea's 13–0 victory over London Bees in 2014. Ella Toone also matched the club record for goals in a single game with five.

Knockout phase 
United qualified top of their group for the second consecutive season, guaranteeing themselves a quarter-final home tie in the process. A 2–1 win over Brighton & Hove Albion saw United reach the semi-final stage for the second consecutive season, setting up a home tie with Chelsea. The London side booked their place in the final with a 1–0 win, a repeat of the narrow scoreline in the team's only other previous meeting, with Chelsea later going on to win the final.

Squad statistics 

Numbers in brackets denote appearances as substitute.
Key to positions: GK – Goalkeeper; DF – Defender; MF – Midfielder; FW – Forward

Transfers

In

Out

Loans out

See also

Notes

References

External links 
  

2019-20
Manchester United